Lophocampa atomosa is a moth of the family Erebidae. It was described by Francis Walker in 1855. It is found on Jamaica and Cuba and in Ecuador.

Wingspan is 38 mm for the male and 44 mm for the female.

References

  Retrieved April 21, 2018.

atomosa
Moths described in 1855